The Voise is a river in Eure-et-Loir which flows into the right bank of Eure, which is a tributary of the Seine.

Gallery

References

Rivers of Eure-et-Loir
Rivers of Centre-Val de Loire
Rivers of France